The First term of Edmund Ho Hau Wah as Chief Executive of Macau, officially considered part of "The 1st term Chief Executive of Macau", relates to the period of governance of Macau since the transfer of sovereignty of Macau, between 20 December 1999 and 20 December 2004. Edmund Ho Hau Wah was elected in early 1999 by 200-member Selection Committee as the first Chief Executive of Macau.

Cabinet

Ministry

|}

Executive Council members
The Executive Council was presided by President Edmund Ho Hau Wah and consisted of total 10 members. All members are appointed by the Chief Executive from among members of the Legislative Council and other influential public personnels.

The Convenor of the members was Tang Chi Kin.

References

Government of Macau